Poronduwa (Promise) is a 2001 Sri Lankan Sinhala drama thriller film directed by Chandran Rutnam and produced by Ashoka Perera for Taprobane Films. It stars Ravindra Randeniya and Vasanthi Chathurani in lead roles along with Asoka Peiris and Iranganie Serasinghe. Music composed by Rohana Weerasinghe. It is the 960th Sri Lankan film in the Sinhala cinema.

The film has received mostly positive reviews by critics.

Plot

Cast
 Ravindra Randeniya as Vijendra Rambukwella
 Vasanthi Chathurani as Pooja
 Asoka Peiris as Ajith
 Iranganie Serasinghe as Mrs. Rambukwella
 Somy Rathnayake as Opposition Politician
 Achala Alles as Nurse
 Leena de Silva as Ajith's mother
 Manel Jayasena as Principal
 Vijaya Hettiarchchi
 Channa Wijewardana
 Thalatha Gunasekara
 Suneetha Wimalaweera
 Kumudu Nishantha
 Dharmadasa Kuruppu
 Lucky Wickramanayaka
 Shesha Palihakkara
 Vindya Warakagoda
 Sriyani Perera
 Shohan Perera
 George McDonald

Song track 
 Ananthayak wee - Rookantha Gunathilake  , Chandralekah Perera
 Piyavi Nethu Walin - Amarasiri Peris , Chandralekah

References

External links
 

2001 films
2000s Sinhala-language films